Patricia Campos may refer to:

 Patricia Campos Doménech (born 1977), Spanish football coach and naval aviator
 Patrícia Campos Mello, Brazilian journalist
 Patricia Campos (footballer) (born 1987), Salvadoran footballer
 Patricia Campos (field hockey), player for Uruguay at the 2007 Pan American Games
 Patricia Campos, a character on the 2012 telenovela Corazón apasionado